Tatyana Gennadyevna Chebykina (born November 22, 1968) is a former Russian athlete who mainly competed in the 400 metres. Over the course of her career her greatest success came in relay races.

She is married to the race walker Nikolay Matyukhin.

Achievements

Personal bests
200 metres - 23.20 (1996)
400 metres - 51.01 (1995)

References

External links

Russian female sprinters
1968 births
Living people
Athletes (track and field) at the 1996 Summer Olympics
Olympic athletes of Russia
World Athletics Championships medalists
Universiade medalists in athletics (track and field)
Goodwill Games medalists in athletics
Universiade silver medalists for Russia
Universiade gold medalists for Russia
World Athletics Indoor Championships winners
World Athletics Championships winners
Medalists at the 1995 Summer Universiade
Competitors at the 1998 Goodwill Games
Olympic female sprinters